The Oakland Strokes Rowing Club is a junior rowing club in Oakland, California.

Founding

The Oakland Strokes was founded in 1974 by Ed Lickiss.  A former oarsman at the University of California, Berkeley, Ed won the Pacific Coast Sculling Championship three years in a row and was chosen to represent the United States at the 1940 Olympic Games.  Due to the outbreak of World War II, the games were cancelled and Ed joined the Army Air Corps as a P-38 pilot instead.

After the war Ed returned to Oakland and became a local electrical contractor.  He founded the Lake Merritt Rowing Club in 1960, and established a program of crew for high school students.  Historically, rowing had been a men's sport.   Believing that women would also enjoy crew, Ed began training young women and, with Joanna Iverson and Ted Nash, founded the National Women's Rowing Association in 1964.   Today the USRA honors him with the annual Edwin E. Lickiss Trophy for the Lightweight Women's Four Championship.

Ed envisioned crew as a sport that could provide young athletes with both excellent physical training and the confidence to succeed in life's most challenging endeavors.  To provide a framework for that vision, he incorporated the Strokes as a California nonprofit corporation and it became chartered as Explorer Post 8 and 9 of the Boy Scouts of America, Piedmont Council.

On Ed's death in 1985, a group of his family and friends joined together to keep alive his dedication to rowing.   Today, the Oakland Strokes is operated by a board of directors that include former coaches and rowers and the parents of former rowers and current rowers.  The board sets the policies and carries out the responsibilities of the rowing program.

Coaches
Coaches are Brian de Regt, Alison Dobb Ray,  Dave Adams, Alan Kush, Taryn O'Connell, Erin Mullin, Frank Clayton, Andrew Blair, Teresa Oja (on maternity leave) and Bertram Harney.

The Program Director is UCLA alum Beth Anderson, also the coach of the Women's Novice team.

2005-2006 season
In 2005 and 2006, the Strokes Varsity Women won the Peabody Championship Cup at the Henley Women's Regatta in England, the most prestigious award.

2009-2010 season
The varsity men's squad in the 2009–2010 season qualified two boats for the nationals, thanks to the help of two new coaches to assist Ivan Smiljanic, Rich Wendling and Dameon Engblom. Smiljanic retired as a coach after the season ended, leaving the head coaching job to Engblom. In 2010–11, Engblom led the heavyweight 8 to 3rd at Southwest, just 0.2 seconds behind Los Gatos. However, that eight was not brought to nationals; Engblom chose to bring the varsity four and pair, who went on to get gold and silver, respectively.

The varsity women's squad also swept Southwest Junior Regional Championships (known amongst rowers as "CJ's") in the 2009–2010 season, sending multiple boats to the nationals.

2011-2012 season
In the 2011–12 season, though they came in second to Marin at Southwest Regional Championships, the women's heavyweight 8+ got first at Nationals, held in Oakridge, Tennessee. The lightweight 8 won Regionals by 12.4 seconds, and Nationals by 11.6.

2013-2014 season
In the 2013–14 season, the women's open weight 8+ won the Head of the Charles Regatta with the men's 8+ coming in third. Both men's and women's varsity 8+s won at the Southwest Junior Regional Championships, as did the women's lightweight 8+. Both of the women's 8+s won at Youth Nationals, with the men's varsity 8+ coming in second to Long Beach Junior Crew.

2014-2015 season

As of the fall of 2014, Jason Hilton has left the club to work as an assistant coach for the Stanford men's team. Taking over from Jason is Brian de Regt. Also in the fall of 2014, Derek Byrnes (women's varsity coach) left the club to take a position as the head of Stanford's lightweight women's crew. Taking the place of Byrnes is Alison Dobb Ray.

In the fall of 2014, the men's varsity 8+ won the Head of the Charles Regatta. The Women's boat came in 7th.

The men's varsity did well at the San Diego Crew Classic in 2015, taking first place in the JV 8+ race and second in the varsity race (.10 seconds behind Marin).
The women's varsity failed to do well at San Diego, with their varsity 8+ getting sixth and their JV 8+ taking fourth.

At the Southwest Jr Regional Championships 2015, Oakland won the men's varsity 8+, the men's JV 8+ and took third in the men's 3V 8+. The men's 4V 8+ finished fifth in the 3V event, being the second fastest 4V in the region. The men's 4+ took third and fourth in the final while the men's 4- also took third and fourth.

The men's JV 8+ had a great year, going undefeated all season.
The men's lightweight 8+ failed to qualify for the grand final, taking fourth in the heat (behind Long Beach Jr Crew, Marin Rowing Association and Pacific Rowing Club). This was the end of a disappointing season for the lightweights (seventh place at the Sand Diego Crew Classic).
The men's varsity 8+ and 4+ went to nationals.

At the Southwest Jr Regional Championships, the women's varsity team did decently, the JV 8+ took second, and sv did the 3V 8+. The varsity 8+ took fifth in the grand final. The women's lightweight did well throughout the year, taking third at San Diego Crew Classic and second at Southwest Jr Regional Championships. They also qualified for Youth Nationals in Sarasota, Florida.

References

External links
Oakland Strokes
Youth Nationals

Rowing clubs in the United States
Sports teams in Oakland, California